Daniel Baud-Bovy ( 3 April 1870, Geneva –  19 June 1958, Geneva ) was a Swiss writer and art historian

Biography 

Son of the painter Auguste Baud-Bovy, Daniel Baud-Bovy acquired most of his artistic and literary training in the symbolist milieu in Paris. Significant in the art world in Switzerland, he was curator of the Rath Museum, director of the school of fine arts in Geneva (from 1908 to 1919), president of the Federal Commission of fine arts, artistic correspondent of the  Encyclopédique Review, poet, author of numerous novels, and short stories often illustrated by his painter friends and children's plays. He also published art criticism.

In 1896 he married Jeanne-Catherine Barth (1872–1928), pianist, and was the father of musician Samuel Baud-Bovy.

In 1913, he accomplished the first modern era ascent of Mount Olympus with guide Christos Kakkalos and his compatriot Frédéric Boissonnas.

Baud-Bovy's second marriage, in 1933, was to Aline-Thékla Nachmann, née Mayer (1905–1982).

Recognition 
A street and a park bear his name in Geneva, in the district of Plainpalais, in the immediate vicinity of a building of the university of Geneva

Publications

Bibliography

Archive 
 Private archives of individuals and families from the Library of Geneva: Baud-Bovy, family (19th–20th c.) Personal papers, papers of the Baud and Bovy families correspondence, works, papers, literary, miscellaneous, newspapers, collections of documents, photographs, sketchbooks, drawings. Personal records of Auguste (1848–1899), painter and Daniel Baud-Bovy (1870–1958), writer and art critic, director of the museum and the school of fine arts. – 26.3 m. Unpublished finding aids. – Research instruments published: MONNIER, Philippe M.,"The Baud-Bovy Archives at the Public and University Library". In Genava, n.s., t. XVIII / 1,1970. – Call number (s): Archives Baud-Bovy 1–302; not cataloged (1985/15; 2000/5; 2005/53)

References

External links
 
 Daniel Baud-Bovy, sur le site de la Société genevoise de Généalogie

1870 births
1958 deaths
Writers from Geneva
Swiss art historians